Colm P. O'Donnell is an Irish chemist and engineer; he is a professor of biosystems and food engineering at the University College Dublin who is active in the field of process analytical technology (PAT); he is also a head of university School of biosystems and food engineering — as well as a chairperson of the Dairy processing technical committee of International Federation for Process Analysis and Control (IFPAC).

References

External links 
 

Irish chemists
Alumni of University College Dublin
Academics of University College Dublin
Living people
Year of birth missing (living people)
Place of birth missing (living people)
Food engineers